The Martin's Mill Covered Bridge is a wooden covered bridge spanning Lull's Brook on Martinsville Road in Hartland, Vermont.  Built about 1880, it is one of two surviving 19th-century covered bridges in the town.  It was listed on the National Register of Historic Places in 1973.

Description and history
The bridge is a single span Town lattice truss, resting on concrete abutments. The exterior of the bridge is clad in vertical board siding, which wraps around for a short distance on the insides of the portals. The roof is metal.

The bridge was built about 1880 by James Tasker, who covered bridge historian R.S. Allen describes as one of the most prolific bridgewrights in Windsor County.  Tasker most often built bridges that were a modified version of a kingspost truss; this bridge is the more common Town lattice style.  It is, along with the Willard Covered Bridge, one of two surviving 19th-century covered bridges in Hartland.

See also
National Register of Historic Places listings in Windsor County, Vermont
List of Vermont covered bridges
List of bridges on the National Register of Historic Places in Vermont

References

Covered bridges on the National Register of Historic Places in Vermont
National Register of Historic Places in Windsor County, Vermont
Bridges completed in 1880
Covered bridges in Windsor County, Vermont
Buildings and structures in Hartland, Vermont
Road bridges on the National Register of Historic Places in Vermont
Wooden bridges in Vermont
Lattice truss bridges in the United States
1880 establishments in Vermont